Zaid Mohseni (born July 1, 1969) who along with his brothers Saad and Jahid Mohseni and his sister Wajma Mohseni established Moby Group, Afghanistan's media company with interests in television, radio, print, web and directories, IT&T, and retail. Zaid is Director of Moby's technical and legal divisions.

Zaid’s leadership of the technology division of Moby Group has been the key to successful utilization of modern technology for Afghan needs. Zaid is also a lawyer and former Partner and Head of the Commercial Department of the Melbourne based law firm, Wilmoth Field Warne. He has substantial experience in corporate and commercial law and legal drafting. He is also the Managing Partner of the Afghanistan based law firm, Zamoh Lawyers, servicing corporate and government clients in commercial and litigious matters.

References
 Charlies Rose “A Conversation with Saad Mohseni” (January 2008)
 NPR “Afghan TV Station to Fight Soap Opera Ban” (April 2008)
 NPR “Emerging Afghan Media Triggering Change” (September 2007)
 Marketplace/Public Radio “Radical Change on Afghanistan’s Airwaves” (October 2006)
 ABC Television “Afghan TV” (November 2006)
 SBS Television “Revolutionary TV (August 2005)
 Washington Post “David Ignatius: What Afghans Want” (December 2008)
 Washington Post “Reaching his Prime Time in Afghanistan” (September 2007)
 New York Times “Amid War, Passion for TV Chefs, Soaps and Idols” (August 2007)
 Time Magazine “Capitalism Comes to Afghanistan” (December 2006)
 Fortune “ Cobbling a Media Empire in Kabul” (January 2006)

External links
 Moby Group

Living people
1969 births
Afghan businesspeople
Afghan Tajik people